Trengune is a hamlet in Cornwall, England, United Kingdom. It is part of the civil parish of Warbstow and is located 1.5 miles north and 1 mile west of the village. The River Ottery passes through Trengune. The earliest record of Trengune was in 1356; the meaning is "farm at the downs".

References

Hamlets in Cornwall